Genevra (formerly, Berlin and Genevra Station) is an unincorporated community in Colusa County, California. It lies at an elevation of 98 feet (30 m).  The place was named Berlin in the 1870s by officials of the Southern Pacific Railroad on whose tracks it was established.  The post office was established in 1876, and renamed from Berlin to Genevra during World War I; the post office closed in 1934.

References

Unincorporated communities in California
Unincorporated communities in Colusa County, California
1876 establishments in California